The Haunting of Hewie Dowker is a 1976 Australian film about Hewie Dowker, a Sydney cop who discovers he has psychic powers.

References

External links

Australian television films
1976 television films
1976 films
1970s English-language films
Films directed by Howard Rubie
1970s Australian films